Dichomeris charonaea is a moth in the family Gelechiidae. It was described by Edward Meyrick in 1913. It is found in Sri Lanka.

The forewings are dark purplish fuscous, with a leaden gloss sprinkled with blackish but without other defined markings. The hindwings are fuscous.

References

Moths described in 1913
charonaea